The 2017 Cure Bowl was a post-season American college football bowl game played on December 16, 2017, at Camping World Stadium in Orlando, Florida, with kickoff at 2:30 PM local time. The third annual edition of the Cure Bowl, the game was one of the 2017–18 bowl games that concludes the 2017 FBS football season. Sponsored by automotive retailer AutoNation, the game was officially known as the AutoNation Cure Bowl.

The game featured Georgia State Panthers of the Sun Belt Conference and the Western Kentucky Hilltoppers of Conference USA.  Georgia State beat Western Kentucky by a score of 27–17.

Teams

Western Kentucky Hilltoppers

This was the Hilltoppers' fifth bowl game and their fourth consecutive. They previously won the 2014 Bahamas Bowl, 2015 Miami Beach Bowl and 2016 Boca Raton Bowl. This was their first Cure Bowl appearance.

Georgia State Panthers

This was the Panthers' second bowl and second Cure Bowl appearance in school history. They previously lost to San Jose State in 2015.

Game summary

Scoring summary

Statistics

References

2017–18 NCAA football bowl games
2017
2017
2017
2010s in Orlando, Florida
2017 in sports in Florida
Cure Bowl